Wonderland is an original novella written by Mark Chadbourn and based on the long-running British science fiction television series Doctor Who. It features the Second Doctor and Ben and Polly. It was released both as a standard edition hardback and a deluxe edition featuring a frontispiece by Dominic Harman. Both editions have a foreword by Graham Joyce.

Plot
San Francisco. The late 60s. An innocent young woman named Summer is caught up in danger as a popular new drug seems to be far more than just a way to have a good time. Fortunately she gains three allies, British tourists seemingly, Ben, Polly and The Doctor.

References

External links
The Cloister Library - Wonderland

2003 British novels
2003 science fiction novels
Doctor Who novellas
Novels by Mark Chadbourn
Telos Publishing books